The Joint Employment Test (JET Exam) is a competitive examination in India  conducted by the JET Exam Board, an autonomous institute under Ministry of Corporate Affairs, Government of India. By JET Exam candidates can apply for jobs like lekhpal, account officers, and other jobs provided by organisation, Government departments or PSU making part of JET Exam.

Eligibility 
The candidates should have a graduate degree or diploma such as B.Sc., B.com., B.A., B.E., BBA, BMS, BCA, DCA, D.Ed., B.tech. from a central, state or deemed university. A candidate's age should be between 21 and 37 years.  For reserved category, the age limit is 40 years.

Syllabus

See also 
 National Eligibility Test
 Civil Services of India
 Union Public Service Commission

References

External links 
 Official website

Civil service tests in India
2013 establishments in Delhi